Charles Whipple Comstock (October 9, 1858 – May 8, 1917) was an American attorney  and judge who served as the United States Attorney for the District of Connecticut under two presidents.

Early life
Charles Whipple Comstock was born on October 9, 1857 in Montville, Connecticut, to Nathan Strickland and Caroline Mary (Whipple) Comstock. His father's side descended from Reverend John Rogers (the martyr) and that side of the family emigrated to America in the mid 16th century from England. On his mother's side he descended from Governor William Bradford of the Mayflower. His father was a farmer and merchant, leading Charles to attend public schools and Norwich Free Academy.

Legal career
Instead of College he wanted to go into law therefore he began studying under Lafayette S. Foster, and in 1881 he passed the bar and began practicing law in Norwich. He would work with Charles F. Thayer the former mayor of Norwich and George Parsons. In 1913 he had and won his first case before the United States Supreme Court in Robbins- Pattenson v Central Vermont Railroad.

United States Attorney
During President Cleveland's second term in office, he appointed Charles to be US Attorney for the district of Connecticut, a position he held for four years.

Judgeship
He had previously served as a probate judge in Montville from 1889 to 1896.

Politics
In 1914 he was in the race to be the democrat nominee for Governor of Connecticut. He spent years working with the Democrats attending multiple Democratic National Conventions.

Masonry
He was a 32nd degree Freemason.

References 

1858 births
1917 deaths
20th-century American lawyers
19th-century American judges
19th-century American lawyers
American people of English descent
American Freemasons
Connecticut Democrats
Connecticut lawyers
People from Norwich, Connecticut
United States Attorneys for the District of Connecticut